Riachão may refer to:

Places in Brazil
Riachão (São Bento) in Paraíba
Riachão, Maranhão
Riachão, Paraíba
Riachão do Bacamarte in Paraíba
Riachão do Dantas in Sergipe
Riachão do Jacuípe in Bahia
Riachão das Neves in Bahia
Riachão do Poço in Paraíba
Sucupira do Riachão in Maranhão

People
Riachão (singer), Brazilian composer and singer

See also
 Riacho (disambiguation)